Exisulind (tentative trade name Aptosyn) is an antineoplastic agent. It acts by inhibiting the enzyme cyclic guanosine monophosphate phosphodiesterase type 5. It is the sulfone derivative of sulindac, an NSAID. Unlike sulindac, it has known effects on prostaglandin synthesis. It was developed as the potential treatment of several conditions including familial adenomatous polyposis (FAP), precancerous sporadic colonic polyps, cervical dysplasia and the prevention of tumor recurrence in prostate and breast cancer. Exisulind inhibits the enzyme cGMP-PDE, overexpressed in precancerous and cancerous colorectal cells, and induces apoptosis in such cells with minimal effects on normal cells. This apoptotic effect is independent of COX-1 or COX-2 inhibition, p53, Bcl-2, or cell cycle arrest. Preclinical evidence suggests that exisulind also inhibits angiogenesis.

See also 
 Sulindac

References

Antineoplastic drugs
Benzosulfones
Carboxylic acids
Indenes